Sepp may refer to:

Sepp (given name)
Sepp (surname)
Science & Environmental Policy Project
 Sepp (publisher)
Substantially equal periodic payments, US tax-law provision
Single Edge Processor Package
State Enterprise for Pesticide Production, a cover name for Muthana State Establishment, an Iraqi chemical weapons facility

See also
Seppe (disambiguation)
SEP (disambiguation)